Deshamanya Tissa Devendra  is a writer and retired civil servant.

Childhood & education
Devendra received his education from Dharmaraja College, Nalanda College, Colombo and Ananda College Colombo. He later graduated from University of Ceylon and University of Cambridge.

Career

Devendra's career in the public service started in 1953 as a District Land Officer. Later was General Manager of the River Valleys Development Project in Walawe.

Devendra served 40 years in the public service and was the Government Agent in Matara, Trincomalee and Jaffna. He also held positions as Chairman of the Public Service Commission, and Chairman of the Salaries Commission. First President of the Colombo University Alumni Association. Tissa also served as National Expert for the FAO and United Nations.

Author

Devendra is an author and wrote a number of books, in both Sinhalese and English. His book Tales from the Provinces was short-listed for the Gratiaen Prize in 1998. Devendra was also a reviewer of English films along with the late Regi Siriwardena, Donald Abeysinghe, and Mervyn De Silva.

Devendra scripted a television documentary on George Keyt in 1987. His published books include:

 The Emerald Island
 Tales from the Provinces
 Princes Peasants and Clever Beasts
 More Princes, Peasants and Clever Beasts
 On Horseshoe Street

References

 Fabulous out of the mundane
 Reading: it's Tissa's business
 Tissa Devendra - Belletrist
 Tissa Devendra - Chairperson
 On Horseshoe Street : Window to a bygone era
 Recalling a post-colonial past
 As I Like It Traversing with Tissa Devendra
 DR. D.W.DEVENDRA – THE OLDEST NALANDIAN REMEMBERS

Living people
Sri Lankan Buddhists
Alumni of Nalanda College, Colombo
Sinhalese civil servants
Deshamanya
1929 births
Alumni of Dharmaraja College